Jamie McMaster (born 29 November 1982) is an Australian former footballer who last played as an attacking midfielder for the Sutherland Sharks in the National Premier Leagues NSW.

Despite being born in Sydney, Australia, McMaster represented England at U16, U18 and U20 levels before successfully requesting to be eligible for the Australian national team.

Early life
McMaster grew up in Gosford, a region on the Central Coast, and played football for Umina United.

Club career
He began his professional career at Premier League club Leeds United in 1999 as a 16-year-old where he joined Harry Kewell and Mark Viduka in the fleet of Australians in the squad but committed his international future to England.

While at Leeds he began to be loaned around to smaller clubs within England. He was loaned to Coventry City in 2002 during the January transfer market, returned to Leeds in 2002 before being loaned to Swindon Town in the January transfer market for the remainder of the 2003–04 season, scoring once against Stockport County. Upon returning to Leeds for the 2004–05 season he was once again loaned, this time to Chesterfield for the entire season. At Chesterfield he scored twice, with goals against QPR and Peterborough United.

McMaster once again returned this time to Peterborough United. McMaster then requested he be transferred from Leeds while still on loan at Peterborough. He played a few games for Leeds early on in Leeds first season in the championship after being relegated from the Premier League. Following transfer negotiations McMaster moved to AGF Aarhus in Denmark for a very brief period of time before returning home and playing for the Central Coast Mariners in the A-League, where he remained until 2007.

International career
He has been capped for England at under-16, under-18 and under-20 level.

In 2005, FIFA approved a request made by McMaster to be eligible for selection in the Australia national soccer team.

References

External links
 Central Coast Mariners profile
 
 Profile at UpThePosh! The Peterborough United Database
 Profile at leedsutd365.co.uk

1982 births
Living people
Soccer players from Sydney
English footballers
England under-21 international footballers
British people of Australian descent
English people of Australian descent
English people of Scottish descent
Australian people of Scottish descent
A-League Men players
Premier League players
English Football League players
Aarhus Gymnastikforening players
Central Coast Mariners FC players
Chesterfield F.C. players
Coventry City F.C. players
Leeds United F.C. players
Peterborough United F.C. players
Swindon Town F.C. players
Bonnyrigg White Eagles FC players
Sutherland Sharks FC players
National Premier Leagues players
Wollongong Wolves FC players
Marconi Stallions FC players
Association football midfielders
Australian expatriate sportspeople in England
Expatriate sportspeople in England